Fernando Zuqui (born 27 November 1991) is an Argentine professional footballer who plays as a midfielder for Estudiantes.

References

External links
 
 
 
 
 

1991 births
Living people
Sportspeople from Mendoza Province
Argentine footballers
Argentine expatriate footballers
Association football midfielders
Godoy Cruz Antonio Tomba footballers
Boca Juniors footballers
Estudiantes de La Plata footballers
Club Atlético Colón footballers
Yeni Malatyaspor footballers
Argentine Primera División players
Süper Lig players
Argentine expatriate sportspeople in Turkey
Expatriate footballers in Turkey